Andile Eugene Fikizolo (born 13 May 1994), also known as Carot, is a South African soccer player who plays as a midfielder and right wing for Golden Arrows in the South African Premier Soccer League.

References

1994 births
Living people
People from Inanda, KwaZulu-Natal
South African soccer players
Olympic soccer players of South Africa
Thanda Royal Zulu F.C. players
SuperSport United F.C. players
Lamontville Golden Arrows F.C. players
Bloemfontein Celtic F.C. players
Royal Eagles F.C. players
South African Premier Division players
National First Division players
Association football wingers
Soccer players from KwaZulu-Natal